Rhymbocarpus is a genus of lichenicolous (lichen-dwelling) fungi in the family Cordieritidaceae. It has 10 species. The genus was circumscribed by German mycologist Friedrich Wilhelm Zopf in 1896, with Rhymbocarpus punctiformis assigned as the type species.

Species
Rhymbocarpus aggregatus  – host: Buellia griseovirens
Rhymbocarpus boomii  – Dirina ceratoniae
Rhymbocarpus cruciatus  – Diploicia canescens
Rhymbocarpus ericetorum  – on Dibaeis baeomyces
Rhymbocarpus makarovae  – Porpidia
Rhymbocarpus neglectus  – on the Lepraria neglecta species group
Rhymbocarpus pertusariae  – on Lepra panyrga
Rhymbocarpus pubescens  – Lepraria
Rhymbocarpus punctiformis 
Rhymbocarpus roccellae  – Roccella

Host information is from Diederich (2018).

Former Rhymbocarpus species:
Rhymbocarpus elachistophorus  is now Skyttea elachistophora
Rhymbocarpus fuscoatrae  is now Llimoniella fuscoatrae
Rhymbocarpus gregarius  is now Skyttea gregaria
Rhymbocarpus nitschkei  is now Skyttea nitschkei
Rhymbocarpus stereocaulorum  is now Llimoniella stereocaulorum

References

Leotiomycetes
Leotiomycetes genera
Taxa described in 1896
Taxa named by Friedrich Wilhelm Zopf